The 2021 FC Cincinnati season was the club's third season in MLS, and the sixth season of a team playing under the FC Cincinnati brand after three years in the lower-division USL Championship. The club finished with a league worst 4–15–4 record in their second MLS season in 2020, one shortened by the COVID-19 pandemic in Ohio. The season was the first year that FC Cincinnati played home matches at newly built TQL Stadium.

FC Cincinnati's offseason transfers were executed under general manager Gerard Nijkamp and head coach Jaap Stam. On August 6, 2021, Nijkamp and the club mutually agreed to part ways. On September 27, 2021, Stam was relieved of his duties. The team ended the season with a 4–22–8 record, with the team not being able to qualify into the MLS Cup Playoffs for the third consecutive season.

Club

Roster

Player movement

In

Out

Loans in

Loans out

2021 MLS SuperDraft picks

Competitions

Preseason

Major League Soccer

League tables

Eastern Conference

Overall

Results

Statistics

Appearances and goals 
Numbers after plus-sign(+) denote appearances as a substitute.

|-
! colspan=16 style=background:#dcdcdc; text-align:center|Goalkeepers

|-
! colspan=16 style=background:#dcdcdc; text-align:center|Defenders

|-
! colspan=16 style=background:#dcdcdc; text-align:center|Midfielders

|-
! colspan=16 style=background:#dcdcdc; text-align:center|Forwards

|-
! colspan=16 style=background:#dcdcdc; text-align:center|Players who have played for FC Cincinnati this season but have left the club:

|-

Top scorers 
{| class="wikitable" style="font-size: 100%; text-align: center;"
|-
! style="background:#003087; color:#FFFFFF; border:2px solid #FE5000; width:35px;" scope="col"|Rank
! style="background:#003087; color:#FFFFFF; border:2px solid #FE5000; width:35px;" scope="col"|Position
! style="background:#003087; color:#FFFFFF; border:2px solid #FE5000; width:35px;" scope="col"|No.
! style="background:#003087; color:#FFFFFF; border:2px solid #FE5000; width:140px;" scope="col"|Name
! style="background:#003087; color:#FFFFFF; border:2px solid #FE5000; width:75px;" scope="col"|
! style="background:#003087; color:#FFFFFF; border:2px solid #FE5000; width:75px;" scope="col"|
! style="background:#003087; color:#FFFFFF; border:2px solid #FE5000; width:75px;" scope="col"|Total
|-
|1
|FW
|9
|align="left"| Brenner
|8||0||8
|-
|2
|MF
|11
|align="left"| Luciano Acosta
|7||0||7
|-
|3
|FW
|19
|align="left"| Brandon Vazquez
|4||0||4
|-
|rowspan="2"|4
|MF
|31
|align="left"| Álvaro Barreal
|3||0||3
|-
|MF
|6
|align="left"| Haris Medunjanin
|3||0||3
|-
|rowspan="2"|6
|DF
|5
|align="left"| Gustavo Vallecilla
|2||0||2
|-
|DF
|18
|align="left"| Ronald Matarrita
|2||0||2
|-
|rowspan="7"|8
|DF
|2
|align="left"| Edgar Castillo
|1||0||1
|-
|DF
|3
|align="left"| Tyler Blackett
|1||0||1
|-
|MF
|8
|align="left"| Allan Cruz
|1||0||1
|-
|FW
|10
|align="left"| Jurgen Locadia
|1||0||1
|-
|DF
|14
|align="left"| Nick Hagglund
|1||0||1
|-
|DF
|16
|align="left"| Zico Bailey
|1||0||1
|-
|FW
|23
|align="left"| Isaac Atanga
|1||0||1
|-
!colspan="4"|Total
!37!!0!!37

Top assists 
{| class="wikitable" style="font-size: 100%; text-align: center;"
|-
! style="background:#003087; color:#FFFFFF; border:2px solid #FE5000; width:35px;" scope="col"|Rank
! style="background:#003087; color:#FFFFFF; border:2px solid #FE5000; width:35px;" scope="col"|Position
! style="background:#003087; color:#FFFFFF; border:2px solid #FE5000; width:35px;" scope="col"|No.
! style="background:#003087; color:#FFFFFF; border:2px solid #FE5000; width:160px;" scope="col"|Name
! style="background:#003087; color:#FFFFFF; border:2px solid #FE5000; width:75px;" scope="col"|
! style="background:#003087; color:#FFFFFF; border:2px solid #FE5000; width:75px;" scope="col"|
! style="background:#003087; color:#FFFFFF; border:2px solid #FE5000; width:75px;" scope="col"|Total
|-
|1
|MF
|11
|align="left"| Luciano Acosta
|10||0||10
|-
|2
|MF
|36
|align="left"| Rónald Matarrita
|5||0||5
|-
|rowspan="3"|3
|DF
|12
|align="left"| Geoff Cameron
|3||0||3
|-
|FW
|19
|align="left"| Brandon Vazquez
|3||0||3
|-
|MF
|31
|align="left"| Álvaro Barreal
|3||0||3
|-
|rowspan="4"|6
|MF
|6
|align="left"| Haris Medunjanin
|2||0||2
|-
|FW
|9
|align="left"| Brenner
|2||0||2
|-
|DF
|16 
|align="left"| Zico Bailey
|2||0||2
|-
|FW
|23
|align="left"| Isaac Atanga
|2||0||2
|-
!colspan="4"|Total
!32!!0!!32

Disciplinary record 
{| class="wikitable" style="font-size: 100%; text-align:center;"
|-
| rowspan="2" !width=15|
| rowspan="2" !width=15|
| rowspan="2" !width=120|Player
| colspan="3"|MLS
| colspan="3"|Playoffs
| colspan="3"|Total
|-
!width=34; background:#fe9;|
!width=34; background:#fe9;|
!width=34; background:#ff8888;|
!width=34; background:#fe9;|
!width=34; background:#fe9;|
!width=34; background:#ff8888;|
!width=34; background:#fe9;|
!width=34; background:#fe9;|
!width=34; background:#ff8888;|
|-
|| 12 || DF ||align=left| Geoff Cameron || 8 || 0 || 0 || 0 || 0 || 0 || 8 || 0 || 0
|-
|| 5 || DF ||align=left| Gustavo Vallecilla || 7 || 0 || 0 || 0 || 0 || 0 || 7 || 0 || 0
|-
|| 14 || MF ||align=left| Rónald Matarrita || 7 || 0 || 0 || 0 || 0 || 0 || 7 || 0 ||0 
|-
|| 7 || MF ||align=left| Yuya Kubo || 6 || 0 || 0 || 0 || 0 || 0 || 6 || 0 || 0
|-
|| 11 || MF ||align=left| Luciano Acosta || 6 || 0 || 0 || 0 || 0 || 0 || 6 || 0 || 0
|-
|| 33 || MF ||align=left| Caleb Stanko || 6 || 0 || 0 || 0 || 0 || 0 || 6 || 0 || 0
|-
|| 2 || DF ||align=left| Edgar Castillo || 5 || 0 || 0 || 0 || 0 || 0 || 5 || 0 || 0
|-
|| 8 || MF ||align=left| Allan Cruz || 5 || 0 || 1 || 0 || 0 || 0 || 5 || 0 || 1
|-
|| 9 || FW ||align=left| Brenner || 4 || 0 || 0 || 0 || 0 || 0 || 4 || 0 || 0
|-
|| 31 || MF ||align=left| Álvaro Barreal || 4 || 1 || 0 || 0 || 0 || 0 || 4 || 1 || 0
|-
|| 13 || MF ||align=left| Joe Gyau || 3 || 0 || 0 || 0 || 0 || 0 || 3 || 0 || 0
|-
|| 16 || DF ||align=left| Zico Bailey || 2 || 0 || 0 || 0 || 0 || 0 || 2 || 0 || 0
|-
|| 19 || FW ||align=left| Brandon Vazquez || 2 || 0 || 0 || 0 || 0 || 0 || 2 || 0 || 0
|-
|| 20 || MF ||align=left| Calvin Harris || 2 || 0 || 0 || 0 || 0 || 0 || 2 || 0 || 0
|-
|| 64 || MF ||align=left| Florian Valot || 2 || 0 || 0 || 0 || 0 || 0 || 2 || 0 || 0
|-
|| 3 || DF ||align=left| Tyler Blackett || 1 || 0 || 0 || 0 || 0 || 0 || 1 || 0 || 0
|-
|| 6 || MF ||align=left| Haris Medunjanin || 1 || 0 || 0 || 0 || 0 || 0 || 1 || 0 || 0
|-
|| 14 || DF ||align=left| Nick Hagglund || 1 || 0 || 0 || 0 || 0 || 0 || 1 || 0 || 0
|-
|| 15 || MF ||align=left| Kamohelo Mokotjo || 1 || 0 || 0 || 0 || 0 || 0 || 1 || 0 || 0
|-
|| 25 || GK ||align=left| Kenneth Vermeer || 1 || 0 || 0 || 0 || 0 || 0 || 1 || 0 || 0
|-
|| 26 || DF ||align=left| Chris Duvall || 1 || 0 || 0 || 0 || 0 || 0 || 1 || 0 || 0
|-
|| 23 || FW ||align=left| Isaac Atanga || 0 || 0 || 1 || 0 || 0 || 0 || 0 || 0 || 1
|-
!colspan=3|Total !!75!!1!!2!!0!!0!!0!!75!!1!!2

Clean sheets
{| class="wikitable sortable" style="text-align: center;"
|-
! style="background:#003087; color:#FFFFFF; border:2px solid #FE5000; width:35px;" scope="col"|No.
! style="background:#003087; color:#FFFFFF; border:2px solid #FE5000; width:160px;" scope="col"|Name
! style="background:#003087; color:#FFFFFF; border:2px solid #FE5000; width:50px;" scope="col"|
! style="background:#003087; color:#FFFFFF; border:2px solid #FE5000; width:50px;" scope="col"|
! style="background:#003087; color:#FFFFFF; border:2px solid #FE5000; width:50px;" scope="col"|Total
! style="background:#003087; color:#FFFFFF; border:2px solid #FE5000; width:50px;" scope="col"|Games
|-
| 25
| align=left| Kenneth Vermeer
|4||0||4||19
|-
| 22
| align=left| Przemysław Tytoń
|2||0||2||14
|-
| 1
| align=left| Cody Cropper
|0||0||0||1
|-

Awards

MLS Team of the Week

References 

2021 Major League Soccer season
Cincinnati
FC Cincinnati
2020